The seventh gubernatorial election for the city of Bangkok, Thailand was held on August 29, 2004, to determine the governor of Bangkok. The Democrat Party's candidate, Apirak Kosayodhin, won 36.86 percent of the vote.  Of a total of 3,955,855 voters, 2,472,486 people voted, a turnout rate of 62.50 percent. Samak Sundaravej, the incumbent governor, did not seek to run for a second term and ran instead in the 2006 Thai Senate election.

Results

References 

Bangkok gubernatorial elections
Gubernatorial election,2004
2004 elections in Asia
2004 elections in Thailand
2004 in Bangkok
2004 in Thailand
August 2004 events in Thailand